McQueen, Mcqueen, and MacQueen, Macqueen are English-language surnames derived from Scottish Gaelic. There have been several differing etymologies given for the surnames; as well as several differing ways to represent the surname in modern Scottish Gaelic. The surnames are not among the most common surnames in the United Kingdom, Australia, nor the United States.

Etymology
There have been several differing etymologies given for the surname. One view is that it is an Anglicised form of the Gaelic MacShuibhne, which means "son of Suibhne". The Gaelic name Suibhne is a byname, which means "pleasant". This Gaelic name was also used as a Gaelic equivalent of the Old Norse byname Sveinn, which means "boy". Another view is that the Anglicised surname is derived from the Gaelic MacCuinn, meaning "son of Conn". The Gaelic personal name Conn is composed of an Old Celtic element meaning "chief". Another suggested origin of the Anglicised surname is from the Gaelic MacCuithein. 

A similarly spelt surname, Macquien, is considered to be often confused with, and wrongly represented by, Macqueen. This name is considered to be derived from the Gaelic personal name Aoidhean which means "little Aodh". The Gaelic personal name Aodh is a modern form of Áed, which means "fire". Macquien can be presented in Scottish Gaelic as MacAoidhein; and in the north of Scotland as MacCuithein.

Historical forms of the name
The surname has undergone changes over the years. Mackquean (1502); M'Queyn (1543); M'Queen (1609).

Representation in modern Scottish Gaelic
The Anglicised surnames can be represented in Scottish Gaelic several different ways. MacCuinn is the form for the surname of Galloway. MacCuithein is the form for the surname in the north of Scotland; MacCuain is a name found in Argyll around the islands of Easdale, Luing and Seil, and MacShuibhne is the form in the south of Scotland. .

Similar surnames
Similar surnames are McKeen (from Ian); McQuinn (from Conn); McSwain, McSween (from Suibhne, or possibly Sveinn); McSweeney, McQueeney (from Suibhne); Macquien (from Aoidhean); Queen (a reduced form of the surname McQueen, also from Quena).

Statistics
Neither surname ranked within the top 300 recorded in Scotland, within the United Kingdom Census 1901.
McQueen, Mcqueen
In the United Kingdom, the surname was ranked in the United Kingdom Census 1881 as the 17,664th most common surname; with 125 recorded, equalling less than 0.001% of the population. Currently the surname is ranked as the 1,950th most common; with 3,204 recorded, equalling 0.007% of the population. This census shows that the county where the surname occurred the most was Lancashire (in England); with 22 of the name recorded, equalling 0.0006% of the population there. The town where the surname occurred the most, and was most frequent, was Newcastle upon Tyne All Sts (in Northumberland, England); with 11 of the name recorded, equalling 0.0424% of the population there.

In Australia, the surname is ranked 1,531st most common name; with 1,078 recorded equalling 0.007% of the total population.

The surname was ranked as the 1,322nd most common surname in the 1990 United States Census; accounting for 0.009% of the population. It was ranked 1,757th most common surname in the 2000 United States Census; with 18,701 recorded. Of these this number, 60.16% were recorded as being (non-Hispanic) white; 36.12% (non-Hispanic) black; 0.29% (non-Hispanic) Asian and Pacific Islander; 0.44% (non-Hispanic) American Indian and Native Alaskan;  1.59% (non Hispanic) of two or more races; 1.4% Hispanic origin.

Currently worldwide, the surname is most frequently found in Australia, with a frequency of 117.79 per million people (fpm); New Zealand with 113.22 fpm; the United Kingdom with 75.78 fpm; the United States with 57.84 fpm; Canada with 55.47 fpm. The top region where it is located is Rangitikei District (in New Zealand); with 550.36 fpm. The top city is Glasgow (in Scotland). The top forenames with the surname are James, John, David, Robert, and William.

MacQueen, Macqueen
In the United Kingdom, the surname was ranked in the United Kingdom Census 1881 as the 8,913th most common surname; with 347 recorded, equalling 0.001% of the population. Currently the surname is ranked as the 6,817th most common; with 714 recorded, equalling 0.002% of the population. This census shows that the county where the surname occurred the most, and was most frequent, was Inverness-shire (in Scotland); with 86 of the name recorded, equalling 0.0986% of the population there. The town where the surname occurred the most, and was most frequent, was Kilmuir (in Inverness-shire, Scotland); with 26 of the name recorded, equalling 1.0136% of the population there.

In Australia, the surname is ranked 4,770th most common name; with 331 recorded equalling 0.002% of the total population.

The surname was ranked as the 27,425th most common surname in the 1990 United States Census; accounting for less than 0.001% of the population. It was ranked 24,115th most common surname in the 2000 United States Census; with 976 recorded. Of this number, 96.21% were recorded as being (non-Hispanic) white; 1.02% (non-Hispanic) black;  0.92% (non Hispanic) of two or more races; 1.43% Hispanic origin.

Currently worldwide, the surname is most frequently found in Australia, with a frequency of 33.91 per million people (fpm); Canada with 18.11 fpm; the United Kingdom with 16.89 fpm; New Zealand with 8.46 fpm; the United States with 4.54 fpm. The top region where it is located is the Marlborough district (in New Zealand); with 550.36 fpm. The top city is Glasgow (in Scotland). The top forenames with the surname are John, Donald, David, Andrew, and James.

Distribution maps
The following maps show the distribution of families with the surname McQueen and MacQueen.

Persons with the surname

McQueen or Mcqueen
Alexander McQueen (1969–2010), British fashion designer
Armelia McQueen (1952–2020), American actress
Butterfly McQueen (1911–1995), American actress
Chad McQueen (born 1960), American actor
Chris McQueen (born 1987), Australian rugby league footballer
Cilla McQueen (born 1949), English poet
Delroy McQueen, British weightlifter
Diana McQueen (born 1961), Canadian politician
Ewen McQueen, religious leader
Geoff McQueen (1947–1994), television screenwriter
George McQueen (1895–1951), Scottish football player
Glenn McQueen (1960–2002), computer character animator at Pixar Animation Studios
Gordon McQueen (born 1952), Scottish football player
Harold McQueen Jr. (1952–1997), American who was the first criminal executed by the State of Kentucky
Hayley McQueen (born 1979), British TV presenter and reporter, daughter of Gordon
Jim McQueen, American freelance sports illustrator
Joe McQueen (1919–2019), American musician
John McQueen (1804–1867), American member of the Confederate States Congress during the American Civil War
Lee McQueen, participant on the UK television show The Apprentice
Mark McQueen (born 1980), British BAFTA nominated film and TV director
Matt McQueen (1863–1944), Scottish football player
Natalie McQueen (born 1989), English musical theatre actress
Peter McQueen (c. 1780 – 1820), American Indian leader
Ronald McQueen, musician
Steve McQueen (1930–1980), American actor
Steve McQueen (director) (born 1969) English artist and film director
Steven R. McQueen (born 1988), American actor
Tanya McQueen (born 1972), American television personality
Wini McQueen (born 1943), American quilter

MacQueen or Macqueen
MacQueen of Pall à Chrocain, Highland deer stalker
Alex MacQueen (born 1974), English actor
Edith MacQueen (1900–1977), Scottish historian
Eilidh Macqueen (born 1986), Scottish actress
Hector MacQueen (born 1956), Scottish academic
John Macqueen Ward (born 1940), Scottish businessman
Mary Macqueen (1912–1994), Australian artist
Robert Macqueen, Lord Braxfield (1722–1799), Scottish lawyer and judge
Rod MacQueen (born 1949), Scottish rugby coach
Thomas MacQueen (1792–1840), British army officer
W. J. MacQueen-Pope (1888–1960), English theatre historian and publicist

Fictional characters
 Esther McQueen, in the Honorverse science fiction novel series
 McQueen family, in the television soap opera Hollyoaks
 Lightning McQueen, in the Cars franchise
 Hector McQueen, in Agatha Christie's Murder on the Orient Express

See also
Clan Macqueen, Scottish clan
McQueen (disambiguation)

References

Anglicised Scottish Gaelic-language surnames

de:McQueen